Obama Day was a holiday celebrated in Kenya in November 2008 in honor of Barack Obama's victory in the 2008 United States presidential election.

Shortly after the U.S. election result was announced, Kenyan president Mwai Kibaki declared the holiday because Obama was of Kenyan descent.

References 

Barack Obama
Kenyan culture
November observances
 
2008 introductions
Monday observances
Holidays and observances by scheduling (nth weekday of the month)